Typhoon Della was a typhoon that brought heavy damages to Japan in June 1949. Della caused particularly heavy damage to Kagoshima Prefecture.

Meteorological history 

Della began as an easterly wave and can be traced as far east as Truk with consistence. Kwajalein shows the passage also, but its track to Truk is indistinct. The eventual track was substantiated by data at Guam and Yap with intensification evident near 15 N and 127 E, seven days after the easterly wave passage at Truk. A surge of moist unstable air from the south was considered as the primary factor in intensification. A parabolic path was followed, with the eye passing over Okinawa. Contrary to climatological data, Della pursued a path across Kyishi rather than the conventional movement along the polar trough to the south of Japan. Della moved into the Sea of Japan and became extratropical four days after it was detected as a typhoon.

References

See also  
 1949 Pacific typhoon season

1949 in Japan
June 1949 events
Typhoons in Japan